Seyed Abolfazl Rihani, known as Ayatollah Seyed Abolfazl Mousavi Tabrizi ( 1935 – 14 April 2003). He was a member of the Assembly of Experts, was involved with the creation of the Constitution of the Islamic Republic of Iran being a member of the Assembly of Experts for Constitution, and was the Prosecutor-General of Iran.

Birth and education 

Abolfazl Mousavi was born in the city of Tabriz in East Azerbaijan to a religious family. His father's family were a religious clerical family in Tabriz and as a result of this, at the age of 13 Abolfazl Mousavi began his Islamic studies at the Hasaneh Padshah School in Tabriz. After exceeding in his studies, he went to Qom to begin his studies in the Hawza. At the age of 27, he began his studies in Dars-e-Kharej (lit. 'beyond the text'), and Principles of Islamic jurisprudence taught by Ruhollah Khomeini. After these studies, he attended classes of Grand Ayatollah Mohammad Kazem Shariatmadari.

Political life 
Before the Iranian Revolution Abolfazl Mousavi was involved with spreading the tapes of Khomeini and getting the people to back him in Tabriz during his exile. In the mosque Seyyed Hamzeh Mosque in Tabriz, he called on people to follow the path of Khomeini, this led to him being arrested by SAVAK. After his release, he fled to Qom, where he  became a member of the Society of Teachers of the Seminary of Qom and, along with other members of this group, issued statements against the Pahlavi regime.

After the Revolution, Abolfazl Mousavi was very close to Grand Ayatollah Shariatmadari, however due to the infamous clash between him and Khomeini, Tabrizi distanced himself from Shariatmadari. He was a member of the Assembly of Experts for three terms, he represented Tabriz in the Islamic Consultative Assembly, was involved with the creation of the Constitution, was a member of Assembly of Experts for Constitution, and was also the Attorney General of Iran.

Works 
 Letters in Velayat Faqih.

See also 
 List of Ayatollahs
 Usul Fiqh in Ja'fari school
 List of members in the First Term of the Council of Experts
 List of members in the Second Term of the Council of Experts
 List of members in the Third Term of the Council of Experts
 Prosecutor-General of Iran

References 

1935 births
2003 deaths
Politicians from Tabriz
20th-century Iranian politicians
Members of the Assembly of Experts
Members of the Assembly of Experts for Constitution
Iranian ayatollahs